{{DISPLAYTITLE:C10H13NO4}}
The molecular formula C10H13NO4 may refer to:

 Farinomalein
 Methyldopa
 3-O-Methyldopa
 Melevodopa

Molecular formulas